Spud is a common nickname for the potato. 

People
 Spud (nickname), a list of people nicknamed "Spud" or "Spuds"
 Spud Murphy (1908–2005), American jazz musician, bandleader and arranger Lyle Stephanovic
 Rockstar Spud (or Spud), ring name of British professional wrestler James Michael Curtin (born 1983), otherwise known as Drake Maverick
 Surfer Spud, former Operations Director at Live 105 and current vocalist/keyboardist for surf pop band Drifting Sand

Arts and entertainment

Characters
 Fred "Spud" Baker, in the British sitcom Cradle to Grave
 Spuds MacKenzie, a canine mascot in an advertising campaign for Bud Light beer
 Daniel "Spud" Murphy, in the 1993 novel Trainspotting and the 1996 film adaptation
 Arthur "Spud" P. Spudinski, in American Dragon: Jake Long
 Laurie "Spud" Odell, in Mary Renault's 1953 novel The Charioteer
 Spud the Scarecrow, in Bob the Builder
 Spud, in the Australian comic strip Beyond the Black Stump
 Spud, in The Ridonculous Race

Other
 Spud (game), a children's game
 Spud (novel), a 2005 novel by John Howard van de Ruit
 Spud (film), a 2010 adaptation of the novel
 Spuds (film), a 1927 American silent comedy film

Acronym
 Saint Paul Union Depot, a railroad station and transit hub in Saint Paul, Minnesota
 St. Paul University Dumaguete, Dumaguete City, Philippines, a private Catholic university
 Sustainable Produce Urban Delivery, a Canadian online grocery service

Other uses
 Spuds, a nickname of Tottenham Hotspur F.C. English football club and their supporters
 Spuds, Florida, United States, an unincorporated community
 Spud Drive-In Theater, near Driggs, Idaho, United States, on the National Register of Historic Places
 Bark spud (tool), a hand tool used for removing bark from logs
 CJRW-FM (102 Spud FM), a Canadian radio station broadcasting in Summerside, Prince Edward Island
 Spud, one of the Operation Bowline United States nuclear test series, detonated in July 1968
 Spuds, steel piles that can be lowered and raised to position a dredge - see Dredging#Clamshell

See also
 Idaho Spud, a candy bar
 Spud bar, a hand tool designed to deliver blows to a target
 Spud One, a Boeing 727 used by Jim Bolger